Planet Ocean, 2012, is a documentary film co-directed by Yann Arthus-Bertrand and Michael Pitiot. The documentary is about the history of the organisms that live in the ocean, and the relationships they have with each other and with humans. The film's cinematographers are Yann Arthus-Bertrand, who is known for his aerial photography, and Michael Pitiot.

References

External links

Wonderful film with incredible Cinematography (LivingDreams TV)
Watch Planet Ocean director Michael Pitiot on FILMCLUB Live

2012 films
2012 documentary films
Documentary films about nature
Films directed by Yann Arthus-Bertrand